Nimrat Kaur (born 13 March 1982) is an Indian actress who appears in Hindi films and on American television. She began her career as a print model and went on to act in theater. After brief appearances in a few films, Kaur starred in Anurag Kashyap's production Peddlers, which was screened at the 2012 Cannes Film Festival. She followed it with her breakthrough role in The Lunchbox, a critically acclaimed drama co-starring Irrfan Khan, which was screened at the 2013 Cannes Film Festival.

In 2015, Kaur played the recurring role of Inter-Services Intelligence (ISI) agent Tasneem Qureishi in the fourth season of the American television series Homeland. She then co-starred with Akshay Kumar in the war thriller Airlift. In 2016, Kaur began portraying Rebecca Yedlin in the second season of the American television series Wayward Pines. She returned for the eighth and final season of Homeland as a series regular in February 2020.

Early life and background
Kaur was born into a Sikh family in Pilani, Rajasthan. Her father Major Bhupinder Singh , SC was an Indian Army officer, and she has a younger sister, Rubina, who is a psychologist based in Bangalore. Her family lived in Patiala, and she studied at Yadavindra Public School, Patiala. In 1994, her father was abducted and killed by Kashmiri Terrorists. Thereafter, her family moved to Delhi-suburb, Noida, where she grew up and attended Delhi Public School, Noida. Later, she studied at Shri Ram College of Commerce, Delhi University and obtained a B.Com Hons in commerce.

Career
After her studies, Kaur moved to Mumbai and worked as a print model. She began working as a theater actress appearing in plays such as Baghdad Wedding (2012), All About Women and Red Sparrow, working with directors like Sunil Shanbag and Manav Kaul.

Kaur was launched in a two-part music video for the songs "Tera Mera Pyar" by Kumar Sanu and "Yeh Kya Hua" by Shreya Ghoshal in 2004. The videos were directed by writer-editor Apurva Asrani. She also did TV advertisements.

Kaur made her film debut with a small role in an English film, One Night with the King (2006), which was shot in Rajasthan. Her Hindi film debut came with Peddlers in 2012, produced by Anurag Kashyap. The film was screened at Cannes Film Festival to good reviews.

Kaur came to public attention when she appeared in a Cadbury Silk commercial.

Kaur attended the Cannes festival for the second time for the epistolary romantic film The Lunchbox (2013). The film was a commercial and critical success. Kaur received rave reviews for her portrayal of a lonely wife who begins a friendship with a man (played by Irrfan Khan) through letters. Raja Sen of Rediff.com said of Kaur's performance: "It is a disarmingly natural performance that is impossible to forget and difficult to analyse, and in this limited space one may merely express admiration." Jay Weissberg of Variety called her a "radiant presence" and Pratim D. Gupta of The Telegraph that "Nimrat strips off all the sentimentality to attach dignity and grace to the character. This one's a sparkling debut."

In 2014, Kaur appeared as ISI agent Tasneem Qureishi in the fourth season of the American TV series Homeland. The same year she committed to star with Rajkummar Rao in an untitled psychological drama to be directed by Saurabh Shukla.

In 2016, she acted in the war drama Airlift, alongside Akshay Kumar. Based on the civil operation of evacuation of Indians based in Kuwait during the Iraq-Kuwait war, the film was released on 22 January to mostly positive reviews. Rajeev Masand in his review wrote: "For the most part, the film feels authentic, and Nimrat Kaur blends right in. Just a wee bit awkward in the early scenes, she comes into her own by the time she must deliver a scathing monologue during a crisis of faith over her husband's actions." The film was a financial success. Kaur also began portraying Rebecca Yedlin in the second season of the American television series Wayward Pines in 2016.

In 2017, Kaur starred as Captain Shikha Sharma in the Hindi web series The Test Case.

She returned for the eighth and final season of Homeland as a series regular in February 2020.

Her latest project being the Netflix hit Dasvi with Abhishek Bachchan & Yami Gautam. She received rave reviews for her performance as the CM's timid wife, who finds herself appointed the CM when her husband is jailed for fraud.

Filmography

Films

Television

Music videos

Web series

References

External links

 
 

Living people
People from Jhunjhunu district
People from Noida
Actresses from Rajasthan
Indian Sikhs
Indian film actresses
Actresses in Hindi cinema
Indian television actresses
Indian stage actresses
Actresses in Hindi television
Delhi Public School alumni
Shri Ram College of Commerce alumni
21st-century Indian actresses
1982 births